Sarala Roy (1861-1946) was an Indian educator, feminist, and social activist. She was one of the first women to matriculate from Calcutta University, and was the first woman to be a member of the University Senate. She founded a school for girls and several women's educational charities, and was a founding member and later, the President of the All India Women's Conference. As President of the All India Women's Conference in 1932, she played a key role in organizing efforts towards women's suffrage, and against child marriage. She was also a strong supporter of educational rights for women and girls.

Early life and education 
She was the daughter of Durga Mohan Das, a prominent social reformer, and her sister, Abala Bose, was also a noted educator. Along with physician Kadambini Ganguly, Roy was one of the first women to be allowed sit the Matriculation exams to graduate from Calcutta University, and she later became the first woman to be a member of the Calcutta University Senate.

Notable work 
Roy was active in the 1920s in efforts to improve access for education for women and girls.

In 1905, she established a local women's organisation in Bengal named the Mahila Samiti. and in 1914, created a second organisation called the Indian Women's Education Society, which was dedicated to funding scholarships for women to study in the United Kingdom. She established the Gokhale Memorial Girl's School in Kolkata in 1920, which was named after Indian independence movement leader Gopalkrishna Gokhale, with whom she maintained a close friendship. Roy trained the teachers at the school herself, and the school made many innovative developments in curriculum, including instructing all their students in three languages: Bengali, Hindi and English. She had also established a range of extra-curricular educational activities in the school, that encompassed sports, music, and theater, and it was common to perform music and songs composed by the writer and Nobel laureate, Rabindranath Tagore, with whom Roy was acquainted. She was also closely involved with the Sakhi Samiti, an organisation founded by  poet, novelist and social worker, Swarnakumari Devi which promoted Indian handicrafts and published several magazines and literary journals in Bengali and English. Her friendship with the Tagore family is reflected in the fact that Rabindranath Tagore dedicated his play, Mayar Khela, to Roy.

Along with Rokeya Sekhawat Hussain, the Bengali science fiction writer and activist, Sarala Roy and her sister, the teacher Abala Bose, worked with the Bengal Women's Education League in the 1920s, to improve access to education for women and children. In 1927, they organised the Bengal Education Conference from 16 to 19 April, and during this conference, Roy, Bose and Hussain made speeches calling for changes to school curriculum, with a particular focus on increasing awareness of the personal rights of women. The All India Women's Conference was created in the same year, and Roy, along with Sarojini Naidu, Kamaladevi Chattopadhyay, Muthulakshmi Reddy and Rajkumari Amrit Kaur, was a founding member of this significant and powerful women's rights organisation in colonial India.

In 1932, Sarala Roy became the President of the All Indian Women's Conference. Roy became president at a time when there was significant momentum towards social reform around the extension of franchise to Indian women. There were wide differences in opinion on the development of efforts towards achieving franchise for women, and along with Dorothy Jinarajadasa, Radhabai Subbarayan and Begum Shah Nawaz, Roy was instrumental in collecting statements and opinions from women on the subject. During her Presidential Address, Ray gave a speech arguing that the key to reforms was to strengthen education for girls, and that this would be critical in efforts to end the prevalent practice of child marriage.

Personal life 
She married Prasanna Kumar Roy, an educator and the first principal of Presidency College in Kolkata, and they had a son who died at a very young age. She later had two daughters, Swarnalata Bose and Charulata Mukherjee, who was also closely associated with the All India Women's Conference.

References 

1861 births
1946 deaths
Bengali Hindus
Bengali educators
20th-century Bengalis
19th-century Bengalis
Indian suffragists
20th-century Indian educators
Indian feminists
Indian social workers
Social workers from West Bengal
Women educators from West Bengal
Indian educators
Indian women educators
19th-century Indian educators
Educationists from India
Founders of Indian schools and colleges
Indian educational theorists
Indian women educational theorists
20th-century Indian educational theorists
19th-century Indian educational theorists